"Blood on Me" is a song by British musician Sampha. The single was released on 25 August 2016.

Reception
The track has been met with positive reviews by music critics such as Pitchfork and AllMusic, noting that it works well with the rest of the album, and many reviewers noting it as a "highlight" of the album.

Music video
The music video for "Blood on Me" was released on 16 September 2016. It was directed by Alex Lill.

Track listing

Charts

References

2016 singles
2016 songs
Sampha songs
Songs written by Sampha
Young Turks (record_label) singles